The 1995 Superbike World Championship was the eighth FIM Superbike World Championship season. The season started on 7 May at Hockenheim and finished on 29 October at Phillip Island after 12 rounds.

Carl Fogarty won the riders' championship with 13 victories and Ducati won the manufacturers' championship. The season was marred by the death of Yasutomo Nagai as a result of injuries sustained in an accident during the Assen round.

Race calendar and results

Championship standings

Riders' standings

Manufacturers' standings

References

External links

Superbike World Championship
Superbike World Championship seasons